Samana falcatella is a species of moth in the family Geometridae. This species is endemic to New Zealand.

References

Oenochrominae
Moths of New Zealand
Endemic fauna of New Zealand
Moths described in 1863
Taxa named by Francis Walker (entomologist)
Endemic moths of New Zealand